The Anantara New York Palace Budapest Hotel is a luxury hotel on the Grand Boulevard of Budapest's Erzsébet körút part, under Erzsébet körút 9–11, in the 7th district of Budapest, Hungary.

History
The building opened on October 23, 1894, as a local office of the New York Life Insurance Company. It was designed by architect Alajos Hauszmann, along with Flóris Korb and Kálmán Giergl. The famous New York Café, located on the ground floor, has been a longtime center for Hungarian literature and poetry. The statues and other ornaments on the facade of the building, as well as the café's 16 imposing devilish fauns, are the works of Károly Senyei. The building was damaged in World War II, and then nationalized during the communist era. The New York Café was renamed the Hungaria Café in 1954. In 1957, the Hungarian sculptors Sándor Boldogfai Farkas, Ödön Metky and János Sóváry carved replicas in the Café of the damaged allegorical sculptures of Thrift and Wealth, America and Hungary. The New York Café was returned to its historic name in 1989, with the fall of Communism.

In February 2001, the structure was sold by the Hungarian government to the Italian Boscolo Hotels chain for $8 million. The building was totally renovated and reopened on May 5, 2006 as New York Palace - A Boscolo Luxury Hotel, a 107-room luxury hotel, including the restored New York Café.
 In 2011, the name was shortened to Boscolo Budapest Hotel. In 2017 it joined The Dedica Anthology Hotels as the New York Palace Budapest Hotel. It was renamed Anantara New York Palace Budapest Hotel on November 24, 2021.

Gallery

References

External links 

 Anantara New York Palace Budapest Hotel official website

Hotels in Budapest
Erzsébetváros
Hotel buildings completed in 1894
Hotels established in 2006
Landmarks in Hungary
New York Life Insurance Company